Pyrausta nugalis is a moth in the family Crambidae. It was described by Snellen in 1899. It is found on Java and in India (Assam).

References

Moths described in 1899
nugalis
Moths of Indonesia
Moths of Asia